Alexander Lindgren (born February 23, 1993) is a Swedish former professional ice hockey player. He made his Elitserien debut playing with Brynäs IF during the 2012–13 Elitserien season.  Lindgren was forced to retire in late 2015 due to a concussion suffered while playing in the HockeyAllsvenskan with Timrå IK.

Career statistics

References

External links

1993 births
Living people
Almtuna IS players
Brynäs IF players
Timrå IK players
Swedish ice hockey forwards
Ice hockey people from Stockholm